Narendra Mohan (10 October 1934 – 20 September 2002) was an Indian industrialist, chairman and managing director of the Jagran Prakashan, the publisher of an Indian newspaper published in Hindi, Dainik Jagran (Hindi: सबसे बिका हुआ अखबार). The late Narendra Mohan's eldest son, Sanjay Gupta, is the current editor and CEO of Jagran.

Life
In the early 1940s, as a youngster in Kanpur, Narendra Mohan didn't have enough money to buy a bicycle and had to rely on traditional public transport in the district – the bullock-cart.

Mohan was drawn into politics as a BJP MP by his political mentor, Mr. Lal Krishna Advani. 

The newspaper's founder was Mohan's father, the late Puran Chand Gupta. Jagran, which was founded in Jhansi, was his third attempt at starting a news business. The newspaper was one of the first to switch to colour and printing satellite editions. The newspaper employs about 2,000 journalists and introduced the concept of 'mohalla' correspondents.

Publications
He authored four books
Dharm Aur Sampradayikta
Aaj Ki Rajniti aur Bhrashtachar
Bharatiya Sanskriti
Hindutva

References

External links
http://rajyasabha.nic.in/kiosk/whoswho/alpha_n5.htm
http://www.tribuneindia.com/2002/20020921/nation.htm#12
Dainik Jagran website
Epaper edition

Indian male journalists
Indian newspaper editors
Indian newspaper publishers (people)
Indian mass media owners
Businesspeople from Uttar Pradesh
People from Jalaun
1934 births
2002 deaths
Journalists from Uttar Pradesh